Hans Schepers (26 March 1930 – 2 January 2012) was a German swimmer and water polo player. In the 1960 Summer Olympics he captained the German water polo team in the men's tournament, finishing sixth.He also competed between 1963-65 in the German swimming championships as a freestyler. He competed for SC Rote Erde Hamm, winning a German championship with them. He coached Red Earth Hamm until 1972, stopping to focus on his career as an Optician.

References

External links
 

1930 births
2012 deaths
German male water polo players
Olympic water polo players of the United Team of Germany
Water polo players at the 1960 Summer Olympics
Sportspeople from Hamm